Kannada Saahithya Parishath is an Indian non-profit organisation that promotes the Kannada language and its literature. Its headquarters are in the city of Bengaluru in the state of Karnataka, India. It strives to promote Kannada language through publishing books, organising literary seminars and promoting research projects. It also organises an annual conference on Kannada literature called Kannada Sahithya Sammelana (Kannada Literary Meet). The current president of the parishat is Dr. Mahesh joshi.

Origin
During the British rule of India, Kannada speakers were spread across different provinces. Coming under the influence of different languages in those provinces, the pronunciation and grammar of Kannada language started to differ across provinces. This led to a gap in communication across the people in these provinces though they spoke the same language of Kannada. Mokshagundam Vishweshwaraiah, who was the Diwan of the Mysore Kingdom felt the need to conserve and promote the Kannada language and literature. In this direction, he started the Mysore Economic Conference and created a study circle under H. V. Nanjundaiah. A sub-committee formed under the study circle came up with five different topics on which suggestions were invited:

 To develop ideas to promote unity and co-operation among Kannada speakers spread across different regions.
 To develop suggestions for a common written Kannada which had diversified across different regions
 To ensure that students learning Kannada language use a common textbook
 To improve the general knowledge among the Kannada speaking population by publishing appropriate books.
 To produce appropriate Kannada translations for words used in other languages, especially the scientific words.

The sub-committee received good responses from the public and it decided to organise a conference in Bangalore on 3 May 1915 to act upon these suggestions. The conference was held on the grounds of the Government High School and was attended by littérateurs, newspaper editors and other dignitaries from different regions. The conference agreed to create the Karnataka Sahitya Parishat with a mandate to conserve and promote Kannada language and literature. H. V. Nanjundaiah was unanimously elected as the President of the Parishat. Apart from the Mysore province, the Karnataka Sahitya Parishat was simultaneously started in the Madras, Mumbai, Hyderabad and Kodagu provinces.

Growth
H. V. Nanjundaiah remained as President of the Parishat for the first five years of its creation. In 1935, an annual event under the aegis of the Parishat called as Kannada Sahitya Sammelana commenced. The foundation ceremony of a separate building to house the Parishat was organised on 12 April 1937 under the Presidency of Karpura Srinivas Rao. The construction of this building was completed on 29 May 1938. B M Srikantaiah was the Vice President of the Parishat from 1938 till 1942. In 1938, the name of Karnataka Sahitya Parishat was changed to Kannada Sahitya Parishat. Under the guidance of B M Srikantaiah, the logo of the Parishat containing the map of the Mysore province with the phrase Sirigannadam gelge, Kannada Sahitya Parishat written inside it was created. Over the period of time; a women's wing, a publishing house, a Kannada journal and literature exams were also added to the repertoire of the Parishat. Kannada Sahitya Parishat branches at the district and taluk levels were also created. A new building is being constructed to replace the existing building of the Parishat at a cost of Rupees five crores. During its existence, the Parishat has contributed to the growth of Kannada language by organising conferences and debates, publication and release of books, organising talks by eminent writers and also by holding the annual Kannada Sahitya Sammelana.

Criticism
The Parishat has reportedly lost focus on its goals due to various reasons including lack of funds and political interference. There were also reports of irregularities conducted within the Parishat in 1987, which prompted the Karnataka Government to nominate an Administrator to the Parishat. The office of the Administrator was removed in 1989.

See also
 Kannada Sahitya Sammelana

External links
 Kannada Sahitya Parishat website
 a PhD thesis by Dr. M.L. Shankaralingappa – Kannada sahitya parishttu – ondu samaajo samsmskrutika adhyayana – published by Kannada sahitya parishattu, Bangalore, awarded by Bangalore University.
 * ka sa pa- saitya sammelanagala nirnayagalu. Edited by Dr. M.L. Shankaralingappa – published by Sumukha Prakashana, Bangalore.
Kannada Sahitya Parishat literally mean Kannada Literary Council

Notes

Kannada literature
Non-profit organisations based in India
Indic literature societies
Organisations based in Karnataka
Culture of Karnataka
1915 establishments in India
Organizations established in 1915
Cultural organisations based in India
Recipients of the Rajyotsava Award 2014